

First round selections

The following are the first round picks in the 1974 Major League Baseball draft.

* Did not sign

Other notable Selections

* Did not sign

Background 
With the number one pick of the June regular phase, San Diego tabbed infielder Bill Almon from Brown University, one of six shortstops selected in round one. Twelve of the first 13 and a total of 16 first round selections went on to become major leaguers, including Lonnie Smith (Philadelphia), Dale Murphy (Atlanta), Garry Templeton (St. Louis), Lance Parrish (Detroit), Willie Wilson (Kansas City) and Rick Sutcliffe (Los Angeles).

Three players from the June regular phase were among the ones who got away. Pitcher Bob Welch (Chicago Cubs, 14th round), infielder Paul Molitor (St. Louis, 28th round) and pitcher Eric Show (Minnesota, 36th round) turned down pro offers for college scholarships.

Notes

External links 
Complete draft list from The Baseball Cube database

References 

Major League Baseball draft
Draft
Major League Baseball draft